Saint Andrew East is a parliamentary constituency represented in the House of Representatives of the Jamaican Parliament. It elects one Member of Parliament MP by the first past the post system of election.

Boundaries 

Covers the areas of Mona and Papine.

References

Parliamentary constituencies of Jamaica